Psyra may refer to:

 Psyra (island), a Greek island in the Aegean sea, referred to by Homer as Psyra
 Psyra (moth), a genus of moths in the family Geometridae

See also
Psara (disambiguation)